South Hill is a ridge in the Central New York Region of New York state. The hill extends from southeast of East Worcester to southeast of Emmons.

References

Mountains of Otsego County, New York
Mountains of New York (state)
Mountains of Delaware County, New York